Kuala Krai District is a district (jajahan) in Kelantan, Malaysia. Historically, it was known as Kuala Lebir.

Background
The Kuala Krai district is a landlocked district in the centre of the State of Kelantan in northeastern Malaysia. The land is hilly, and before the 20th century the entire area was tropical rain forest. The territory contains the confluence of two major rivers, the Lebir and Galas, to form the Kelantan River, which then flows some 70 km northwards through one of the most densely populated flood plains on the Malay Peninsula to its estuary in the South China Sea near the State capital of Kota Bharu.

Kuala Krai was the most affected district in Kelantan by a massive 2014 flood known as Bah Kuning that resulted in property loses and in the federal government declaring a State of Emergency. This catastrophic event was cushioned by great societal support and aid from NGOs.

As transport links improved during the 20th century, people moved into the area to take advantage of the abundant land available for farming. A railway was constructed in the 1920s through the undeveloped interior of Malaysia to link Kelantan State with the main centres of population on the west coast. This line ran through Kuala Krai territory, and settlements became established along the route. Road links followed, and towns and villages grew to house the mainly agricultural population. Rubber production was becoming increasingly important throughout Malaysia at the time, and many rubber-tree plantations were set up in this area. Later, the country-wide shift to oil palm in the 1970s and 1980s saw the establishment of oil palm plantations in the territory, some of which replaced rubber.

Kuala Krai was originally part of Ulu Kelantan until it was split following a re-delineation in 1974. Kuala Krai formally gained its own district and municipal administration in 1977.

Infrastructure developed to support the population, and by the end of the 20th century Kuala Krai town had become a busy, thriving town as well as the administrative centre for the territory.

Demographics

Kuala Krai District has an area of 2329 km² and comprises three subdistricts (daerah):

 Batu Mengkebang (Kuala Krai town) (726.9 km²) with 122 villages
 Dabong (844.5 km²) with 27 villages
 Olak Jeram (Manek Urai)(757.6 km²) with 67 villages

Some of the better known towns and villages in the territory include Dabong, Kemubu, Manek Urai, Kampung Pahi, Kampung Peria and Kampung Laloh.

Secondary schools
The secondary schools in the territory are:
Maahad Rahmaniah Padang Sembilan (SMU (A)Rahmaniah), 18000 Kuala Krai
Sekolah Menengah Kebangsaan Dabong (SMK Dabong), 18200 Dabong
Sekolah Menengah Kebangsaan Keroh (SMK Keroh), 18000 Kuala Krai
Sekolah Menengah Kebangsaan Laloh (SMK Laloh), 18000 Kuala Krai
Sekolah Menengah Kebangsaan Manek Urai (SMK Manek Urai), 18050 Kuala Krai
Sekolah Menengah Kebangsaan Mengkebang (SMK Mengkebang), 18000 Kuala Krai
Sekolah Menengah Kebangsaan Pahi (SMK Pahi), 18000 Kuala Krai
Sekolah Menengah Kebangsaan Sultan Yahya Petra (1) (SMK Sultan Yahya Petra (1)), 18000 Kuala Krai
Sekolah Menengah Teknik Kuala Krai (SM Teknik Kuala Krai), 18000 Kuala Krai
Sekolah Menengah Kebangsaan Kuala Krai (SMK Kuala Krai), Sungai Durian, 18000 Kuala Krai
Sekolah Menengah Kebangsaan Sultan Yahya Petra (2) (SMK Sultan Yahya Petra (2)), 18000 Kuala Krai
Maktab Rendah Sains Mara Kuala Krai*Fews Sekolah Menengah Ugama
Sekolah Menengah Kebangsaan Bandar Kuala krai(SMKBKK)

Population

The population of Kuala Krai territory was 117,800 in 2009.

Ranking Population Jajahan Kuala Krai.

Population ethnicity
The population and ethnicity of the territory is as follows:

Attractions
 Taman Tasik Krai
 Taman Chintawangsa
 Taman Masjid Bandar
 Zoo Mini Kuala Krai
 Muzium Kuala Krai
 Tangga Bradley
 Jambatan Sultan Ismail
 Tembikar Kampung Mambong
 Kampung Lemang Manek Urai 
 Gunung Stong
 Gua Ikan
 Air Terjun Jelawang
 Lata Berangin
 Lata Chenulang
 Lata Rek
 Lata Y
 Istana Sangkut

Famous people from Kuala Krai
 Loh Sea Keong, Malaysian professional cyclist
 Mee Fong, a commercial photographer, had a studio in Kuala Krai in 1930
Mohd Khairul Anuar also known as Lan Cairo, who is a Nurse. He was born in Kuala Krai on Dragon Years 27 May 1988. He is very good personal rapport with international people as well as a representative of Malays to the worlds. 
 Datuk Rafiah Salim, is the first female Vice-Chancellor in Malaysia, posted to Universiti Malaya.
 T. Wignesan, writer, was born in Kuala Krai in the early 1930s
 Tengku Budriah binti Al-Marhum Tengku Ismail, the Raja Perempuan of Perlis, was born in Kuala Krai on 28 March 1925. Her husband, Almarhum Tuanku Syed Putra ibni Almarhum Syed Hassan Jamalullail was elected as the third King of Malaysia (known as Yang di-Pertuan Agong) from 1960 to 1965.
 Terence Fernandez, a Journalist and current deputy editor special reports & investigations of The Sun Newspaper. He was kidnapped in Iraq in 2003 but survived and currently writes a column in The Sun every Tuesday and Thursday, frequently writing on corruption and mismanagement of funds by politicians. He grew up in Kuala Krai and spent his entire childhood and teenage years there.
 Zang Toi, New York fashion designer, was born in Kuala Krai on 11 June 1961
 Muhammad Shahrol Nizam, centerback for UPNM F.C. on 3 September 2019.

Federal Parliament and State Assembly Seats 

List of LMS district representatives in the Federal Parliament (Dewan Rakyat)

List of LMS district representatives in the State Legislative Assembly of Kelantan

See also

Kuala Krai Bridge
Kuala Krai railway station

References